Cytisus nigricans, the black broom, is a species of flowering plant in the subfamily Faboideae of the  family Fabaceae. Masses of brilliant yellow, slightly fragrant pea-like flowers appear in long racemes on the current year's growth in summer and early autumn. 

It is hardy but prefers a sheltered position in full sun, with poor soil. It is preferable to remove the mature seed pods in autumn.

References

nigricans
Flora of Serbia